Marc Sorkin or Mark Sorkin (1902–1986) was a Russian-born film editor and director. He worked with Georg Wilhelm Pabst on a number of films as editor or assistant director.

He was born in the Lithuanian capital Vilnius which was then part of the Russian Empire. He began working in the German film industry in Berlin in the 1920s. Following the Nazi Party's takeover of power in 1933, the Jewish Sorkin left for France where he worked in that country's cinema industry. After the Invasion of France by the Germans in 1940 he left for the United States via Casablanca.

Selected filmography
 Joyless Street (1925)
 The Love of Jeanne Ney (1927)
 The Devious Path (1928)
 Westfront 1918 (1930)
 Morals at Midnight (1930)
 Scandalous Eva (1930)
 Mountains on Fire (1931)
 Kameradschaft (1931)
 The Five Accursed Gentlemen (1932)
 Teilnehmer antwortet nicht (co-director: Rudolph Cartier, 1932)
 Three on a Honeymoon (1932)
 Honeymoon Trip (1933)
 Street of Shadows (1937)
 The Shanghai Drama (1938)
 The White Slave (1939)
 Serenade (1940)
 Pictura (1951)

References

Bibliography 
 Rentschler, Eric. The Films of G.W. Pabst: An Extraterritorial Cinema. Rutgers University Press, 1990.

External links 
 

Film people from Vilnius
1902 births
1986 deaths
Russian film directors
Russian film editors
Russian Jews
Jewish emigrants from Nazi Germany to France
Emigrants from the Russian Empire to Germany
French emigrants to the United States